Ronald Martin Foster (3 October 1896 – 2 February 1998), was an American mathematician at Bell Labs whose work was of significance regarding electronic filters for use on telephone lines.  He published an important paper, A Reactance Theorem, (see Foster's reactance theorem) which quickly inspired Wilhelm Cauer to begin his program of network synthesis filters which put the design of filters on a firm mathematical footing. He is also known for the Foster census of cubic, symmetric graphs and the 90-vertex cubic symmetric Foster graph.

Education
Foster was a Harvard College graduate S.B. (Mathematics), summa cum laude, Class of 1917. He also received two honorary Sc.D.s.

Professional career
1917 – 1943 Research & Development Department (later Bell Labs), American Telephone & Telegraph, as a Research Engineer (Applied Mathematician), New York City, New York.
1943 – 1963 Professor and Head of Department of Mathematics, Polytechnic Institute of Brooklyn, Brooklyn, New York City, New York.

Publications
Campbell, GA, Foster, RM, Fourier Integrals for Practical Applications, "Bell System Technical Journal", pp 639–707, 1928.
Pierce, BO, Foster. RM. "A Short Table of Integrals", Fourth Edition, Ginn and Company, pp 1–189, 1956.

References

1896 births
American centenarians
Men centenarians
Scientists at Bell Labs
American electronics engineers
20th-century American mathematicians
Graph theorists
Harvard College alumni
1998 deaths
Polytechnic Institute of New York University faculty
20th-century American engineers